The 2017 FIVB Beach Volleyball World Championships (also known as the FIVB Beach Volleyball World Championships presented by A1 due to sponsorship reasons) was the eleventh edition of the tournament and the world championship for the sport of beach volleyball for both men and women. The tournament was held from 28 July to 6 August 2017 in Vienna, Austria. The tournament had a prize money of USD $500,000 per gender.

Competition schedule

Medal summary

Medal table

Medal events

Men's tournament

Knockout stage bracket

Women's tournament

Knockout stage bracket

References

External links
Official website

 
Beach Volleyball World Championships
2017 in beach volleyball
2017 in Austrian sport
International volleyball competitions hosted by Austria
Sports competitions in Vienna
Beach Volleyball World Championships
Beach Volleyball World Championships